Kapampangan or Pampangan is an Austronesian language, and one of the eight major languages of the Philippines. It is the primary and predominant language of the entire province of Pampanga and southern Tarlac, on the southern part of Luzon's central plains geographic region, where the Kapampangan ethnic group resides. Kapampangan is also spoken in northeastern Bataan, as well as in the provinces of Bulacan, Nueva Ecija, and Zambales that border Pampanga. It is further spoken as a second language by a few Aeta groups in the southern part of Central Luzon.

Classification
Kapampangan is one of the Central Luzon languages of the Austronesian language family. Its closest relatives are the Sambalic languages of Zambales province and the Bolinao language spoken in the towns of Bolinao and Anda in Pangasinan. These languages share the same reflex  of the proto-Malayo-Polynesian *R.

History
Kapampangan is derived from the root word  ('riverbank'). The language was historically spoken in the Kingdom of Tondo, ruled by the Lakans.

"Crissotan" was written by Amado Yuzon, Soto's 1950s contemporary and Nobel Prize nominee for peace and literature, to immortalize his contribution to Kapampangan literature.

Geographic distribution
Kapampangan is predominantly spoken in the province of Pampanga and southern Tarlac (Bamban, Capas, Concepcion, San Jose, Gerona, La Paz, Victoria and Tarlac City). It is also spoken in border communities of the provinces of Bataan (Dinalupihan, Hermosa and Orani), Bulacan (Baliuag, San Miguel, San Ildefonso, Hagonoy, Plaridel, Pulilan and Calumpit), Nueva Ecija (Cabiao, San Isidro, Gapan and Cabanatuan) and Zambales (Olongapo City and Subic). In Mindanao, a significant Kapampangan-speaking minority also exists in South Cotabato, specifically in General Santos and the municipalities of Polomolok and Tupi. According to the 2000 Philippine census, 2,312,870 people (out of the total population of 76,332,470) spoke Kapampangan as their native language.

Phonology
Standard Kapampangan has 21 phonemes: 15 consonants and five vowels; some western dialects have six vowels. Syllabic structure is relatively simple; each syllable contains at least one consonant and a vowel.

Vowels
Standard Kapampangan has five vowel phonemes:
, an open-mid front unrounded vowel similar to English bed
, a close front unrounded vowel similar to English machine
, a close-mid back rounded vowel similar to English forty
, a close back rounded vowel similar to English flute

Monophthongs have allophones in unstressed and syllable-final positions:
 becomes  in all unstressed positions.
Unstressed  is usually pronounced , as in English bit and book respectively (except final syllables).
In final syllables  can be pronounced , and  can be pronounced .
Unstressed  are usually pronounced , respectively (except final syllables).

Consonants
In the chart of Kapampangan consonants, all stops are unaspirated. The velar nasal occurs in all positions, including the beginning of a word. Unlike other languages of the Philippines but similar to Ilocano, Kapampangan uses /h/ only in words of foreign origin.

A glottal stop at the end of a word is often omitted in the middle of a sentence and, unlike in most languages of the Philippines, is conspicuously absent word-internally; hence, Batiáuan's dropping of semivowels from its very name.

Stress
Stress is phonemic in Kapampangan. Primary stress occurs on the last or the next-to-last syllable of a word. Vowel lengthening accompanies primary or secondary stress, except when stress occurs at the end of a word. Stress shift can occur, shifting to the right or left to differentiate between nominal or verbal use (as in the following examples):
 ('should, ought to') →  ('deed, concern, business')
 ('gather, burn trash') →  ('trash pile')

Stress shift can also occur when one word is derived from another through affixation; again, stress can shift to the right or the left:
 →  ('company')
 →  ('melt, digest')

Sound changes

Grammar

Kapampangan is a VSO or Verb-Subject-Object language. However, the word order can be very flexible and change to VOS (Verb-Object-Subject) and SVO (Subject-Verb-Object). Root words are frequently derived from other words by means of prefixes, infixes, suffixes and circumfixes.

Kapampangan can form long words through extensive use of affixes, for example: , 'a group of people having their noses bleed at the same time', 'everyone loves each other', 'can speak Kapampangan', and  'until to fall in love'. Long words frequently occur in normal Kapampangan.

Nouns
Kapampangan nouns are not inflected, but are usually preceded by case markers. There are three types of case markers: absolutive (nominative), ergative (genitive), and oblique.

Unlike English and Spanish (which are nominative–accusative languages) and Inuit and Basque (which are ergative–absolutive languages), Kapampangan has Austronesian alignment (in common with most Philippine languages). Austronesian alignment may work with nominative (and absolutive) or ergative (and absolutive) markers and pronouns.

Absolutive or nominative markers mark the actor of an intransitive verb and the object of a transitive verb. Ergative or genitive markers mark the object (usually indefinite) of an intransitive verb and the actor of a transitive one. It also marks possession. Oblique markers, similar to prepositions in English, mark (for example) location and direction. Noun markers are divided into two classes: names of people (personal) and everything else (common).

Examples:
 ('The man arrived.')
 ('Juan saw Maria.')
 ('Elena and Roberto will go to Miguel's house.')
 ('Where are the books?')
 ('I will give the key to Carmen.')

Pronouns
Kapampangan pronouns are categorized by case: absolutive, ergative, and oblique.

Examples
 ('I wrote.')
 ('I wrote to him.')
 ('He [or she] wrote me.')
 ('He [or she] has arrived.') Note:  'He arrived (or arrives)';  'He has arrived.'
 ('Tell it to me.')
 ('Who called you?')
 ('They are reading.')
 ('Are the pigs eating?')

Genitive pronouns follow the word they modify. Oblique pronouns can replace the genitive pronoun, but  precede the word they modify.

; ;  ('my house')

The dual pronoun  and the inclusive pronoun  refer to the first and second person. The exclusive pronoun  refers to the first and third persons.

 ('We [dual] do not have rice.')
 ('We [inclusive] do not have rice.')
,  ('We [exclusive] do not have rice.')

Kapampangan differs from many Philippine languages in requiring the pronoun even if the noun it represents, or the grammatical antecedent, is present.

 (not ; 'Ernie arrived').
 (not ; 'Maria and Juan are reading').
 (not ; 'José wrote you').

Special forms

 ('He is in Pampanga').
,  ('The doctors are no longer here').

Pronoun combinations
Kapampangan pronouns follow a certain order after verbs (or particles, such as negation words). The enclitic pronoun is always followed by another pronoun (or discourse marker:
 ('I saw you').
 ('He wrote to me').

Pronouns also combine to form a portmanteau pronoun:
 ('I saw her').
 ('I will give them money').

Portmanteau pronouns are not usually used in questions and with the word :
 ('Do you see him?')
,  ('He likes that, too').

In the following chart, blank entries denote combinations which are deemed impossible. Column headings denote pronouns in the absolutive case, and the row headings denote the ergative case.

Demonstrative pronouns
Kapampangan's demonstrative pronouns differ from other Philippine languages by having separate forms for singular and plural.

In their locative forms,  is used when the person spoken to is not near the subject spoken of;  is used when the person spoken to is near the subject spoken of.

The plural forms of a demonstrative pronoun and its existential form (for the nearest addressee) are exceptions.

 ('What's this?')
,  ('These flowers smell nice').
 ('Who is that man?')
,  ('Come here').
 ('They will eat there').
 ('Who is that child?')
 ('So that's where your glasses are!')
 ('I haven't seen one of these before').
 ('Those are delicious').
 ('Here are the two gifts for you').
 ('I like you!')
 ('I love you!')
 ('Let's eat!')
 ('I don't want to lose you!')

Verbs
Kapampangan verbs are morphologically complex, and take a variety of affixes reflecting focus, aspect and mode. The language has Austronesian alignment, and the verbs change according to triggers in the sentence (better known as voices). Kapampangan has five voices: agent, patient, goal, locative, and cirumstantial. The circumstantial voice prefix is used for instrument and benefactee subjects.

Non-subject agents are marked with the ergative-case ; non-subject patients are marked with the accusative-case -ng, which is cliticized onto the preceding word.

DIR:direct case morpheme
CT:cirumstantial trigger

Ambiguities and irregularities 
Speakers of other Philippine languages find Kapampangan verbs difficult because some verbs belong to unpredictable verb classes and some verb forms are ambiguous. The root word  ('write') exists in Tagalog and Kapampangan:
 means 'is writing' in Kapampangan and 'will write' in Tagalog.
 means 'will write' in Kapampangan and 'wrote' in Tagalog. It is the infinitive in both languages.
 means 'wrote' in both languages. In Kapampangan it is in the actor focus or object focus, and object focus only in Tagalog.

The object-focus suffix -an represents two focuses; the only difference is that one conjugation preserves -an in the completed aspect, and it is dropped in the other conjugation:
 ('to pay someone'):  ('will pay someone'),  ('is paying someone'),  ('paid someone')
 ('to pay for something'):  ('will pay for something'),  ('is paying for something'),  ('paid for something')

Other Philippine languages have separate forms; Tagalog has -in and -an in, Bikol and most of the Visayan languages have -on and -an, and Ilokano has -en and -an due to historical sound changes in the proto-Philippine /*e/.

Many of these verbs undergo a change of vowel instead of taking the infix -in- (completed aspect).

This change of vowel also applies to certain object-focus verbs in the completed aspect. In addition to  becoming ,  becomes  in certain cases (for example,  ['brought something'],  ['worked on something'] and  ['bought']).

There is no written distinction between the two mag- affixes;  may mean 'is speaking' or 'will speak', but there is an audible difference.  means 'will speak' while  means 'is speaking'.

Enclitics
: used optionally in yes-and-no questions and other types of questions
, : even, even if, even though
: conditional particle expressing an unexpected event; if
: reporting (hearsay) particle indicating that the information is second-hand; he said, she said, they said, it was said, allegedly, reportedly, supposedly
, : inclusive particle which adds something to what was said before; also, too
: expresses hope or an unrealized condition (with verb in completed aspect); also used in conditional aspect
: expresses uncertainty or an unrealized idea; perhaps, probably, seems
: limiting particle; only, just
, 
: now, already, yet, anymore
: still, else
: used in making contrasts and to soften requests and emphasis
: expresses cause; because, because of
: used in affirmations or emphasis and to soften imperatives; indeed
: realization particle, indicating that the speaker has realized (or suddenly remembered) something
, : politeness particle

Examples:
: 'I was told that it is lucky.'
, : 'Your boyfriend is also educated.'

Existence and possession
To express existence (there is, there are) and possession (to have), the word  is used:
: They also have a conscience.

Negation
 ('He did not buy.')

 is the opposite of :
 ('They say that there is no more love.')

 is sometimes used instead of :
 ('I did not buy it.')

Interrogative words
 is used to ask how something is. Frequently used as a greeting ('How are you?'), it is derived from the Spanish 
 ('How are you?')
 ('How is the patient?')

 means 'what':  ('What are you doing?')

 means 'who':
 ('Who is Jennifer?')

, meaning 'where', is used to ask about the location of an object and not used with verbs:
 ('Where is the driver?'  is the Kapampangan phonetic spelling of English driver).
 ('Where is Henry?')

 means 'why':
 ('Why are you here?')
 ('Why are you not in your house?')

 means 'whose' or 'whom':
 ('To whom will you give that?')
 ('Whose dandruff is this?')

 means 'how many':
 ('How many papayas?')
 ('How many children did your mother birth?')

 means 'when':
 ('When is the fiesta?')
 ('When is your birthday?')

 means 'how':
 ('How do you do this?')
 ('How do you become a productive member of the society?')

 means 'how much':
 ('How much is one bread?')
 ('How much are the milktea, burger and fries?')

 means 'to what degree':
 ('How beautiful are you?', literally 'To what degree are you beautiful?')
 ('How many did you buy?', literally 'To what amount did you buy?')

 means 'which':
 ('Which of these do you want?')
 ('Who do you choose among them?')

Lexicon

Kapampangan borrowed many words from Chinese (particularly Cantonese and Hokkien), such as:
, '(paternal) grandmother', from 
, 'uncle', from  
, '2nd eldest sister', from 
, '2nd eldest brother', from 
, '2nd eldest grandson' (a surname), from 
, '5th eldest grandson' (a surname), from 
, '6th eldest grandson' (a surname), from 
, '8th eldest grandson' (a surname), from 
, '(maternal) grandmother', from 
, '(maternal) grandfather', from 
, 'eldest sister', from 
, 'eldest brother', 
, '3rd eldest brother', from 
, '4th eldest sister', from 
, '3rd eldest grandson' (a surname), from 
, 'pet, to look after, thank you' (name), from 
, '4th eldest grandson' (a surname), from 
, '7th eldest grandson' (a surname), from 
, 'key', from 
, '4th eldest sister', from 
, '4th eldest brother', from 
, 'eldest grandson' (a surname), from 
, 'noodles' (literally 'instant meal'), from 
, 'bad luck' (literally 'without clothes and food'), from 
, 'tea', from 
, 'name', from 
,'full, satisfied' (a surname), from 
, 'Chinese lettuce', from 
, 'Gold' (a surname), from 
, 'spring roll', from 
, Kapampangan soup, from 
, 'tofu' (a snack), from 
, 'soy sauce', from 
, 'copper wire', from 
, 'wooden clogs', from 

Due to the influence of Buddhism and Hinduism, Kapampangan also acquired words from Sanskrit. A few examples are:

, 'home', from the Sanskrit  alaya
, 'fate', from the Sanskrit  karma
, 'divine law', from the Sanskrit  dharma
, 'magic formulas', from the Sanskrit  mantra
, 'power', from the Sanskrit  upaya
, 'voice', from the Sanskrit  svara
, 'face', from the Sanskrit  rupa
, 'every', from the Sanskrit  
, 'eclipse/dragon', from the Sanskrit  rahu
, 'giant eagle' (a surname, 'phoenix'), from the Sanskrit  garuda
, 'south' (a surname), from the Sanskrit  
, 'admiral' (a surname), from the Sanskrit  lakshmana
 'demerit, bad karma' from the Sanskrit  
 'fruit, blessings' from the Sanskrit  phala

Orthography

Kapampangan, like most Philippine languages, uses the Latin alphabet. Before the Spanish colonization of the Philippines, it was written in old Kapampangan writing. Kapampangan is usually written in one of three different writing systems: sulat Baculud, sulat Wawa and a hybrid of the two, Amung Samson.

The Spanish-based orthography is primarily associated with literature by authors from Bacolor and the text used on the Kapampangan .

This orthography, based on the Abakada alphabet was used by writers from Guagua and rivaled writers from the nearby town of Bacolor.

This system was created by former Catholic priest Venancio Samson during the 1970s to translate the Bible into Kapampangan. It resolved conflicts between the use of ⟨q⟩ and ⟨c⟩ (in ) and ⟨k⟩ (in ) by using ⟨k⟩ before ⟨e⟩ and ⟨i⟩ (instead of [qu]⟩ and using ⟨c⟩ before ⟨a⟩, ⟨o⟩, and ⟨u⟩ (instead of ⟨k⟩). The system also removed ⟨ll⟩ and ⟨ñ⟩ (from Spanish), replacing them with ⟨ly⟩ and ⟨ny⟩.

Orthography has been debated by Kapampangan writers, and orthographic styles may vary by writer. The  system has become the popular method of writing due to the influence of the Tagalog-based Filipino language (the national language) and its orthography. The  system is used by the Akademyang Kapampangan and the poet Jose Gallardo.

Prayers, words and sentences

Sign of the cross: 
The Creed: 
The Lord's Prayer: 
Hail Mary: 
Gloria Patri: 
Salve Regina: 

Numbers:
One –  (used when reciting numbers;  used for counting)
Two – 
Three – 
Four – 
Five – 
Six – 
Seven – 
Eight – 
Nine – 
Ten – 

Sentences:
My name is John. – 
I am here! – 
Where are you? – 
I love you. – 
What do you want? – 
I will go home. – 
They don't want to eat. – 
He bought rice. – 
She likes that. – 
May I go out? – 
I can't sleep. – 
We are afraid. – 
My pet died yesterday. – 
How old are you? – 
How did you do that? – 
How did you get here? – 
How big is it? – 
When will you be back? –

See also

 Malayo-Polynesian languages
 Tarlac
 Bataan

References
Footnotes

Bibliography
Bautista, Ma. Lourdes S. 1996. An Outline: The National Language and the Language of Instruction. In Readings in Philippine Sociolinguistics, ed. by Ma. Lourdes S. Bautista, 223. Manila: De La Salle University Press, Inc.
Bergaño, Diego. 1860. Vocabulario de la Lengua Pampanga en Romance. 2nd ed. Manila: Imprenta de Ramirez y Giraudier.
Castro, Rosalina Icban. 1981. Literature of the Pampangos. Manila: University of the East Press.
Fernández, Eligío. 1876. Nuevo Vocabulario, ó Manual de Conversaciónes en Español, Tagálo y Pampángo. Binondo: Imprenta de M. Perez
Forman, Michael. 1971. Kapampangan Grammar Notes. Honolulu: University of Hawaii Press
Gallárdo, José. 1985–86. Magaral Tang Capampangan. Ing Máyap a Balità, ed. by José Gallárdo, May 1985- June 1986. San Fernando: Archdiocese of San Fernando.
Henson, Mariano A. 1965. The Province of Pampanga and Its Towns: A.D. 1300–1965. 4th ed. revised. Angeles City: By the author.
Kitano Hiroaki. 1997. Kapampangan. In Facts About The World's Major Languages, ed. by Jane Garry. New York: H.W. Wilson. Pre-published copy
Lacson, Evangelina Hilario. 1984. Kapampangan Writing: A Selected Compendium and Critique. Ermita, Manila: National Historical Institute.
Manlapaz, Edna Zapanta. 1981. Kapampangan Literature: A Historical Survey and Anthology. Quezon City: Ateneo de Manila University Press.
Panganiban, J.V. 1972. Diksyunaryo-Tesauro Pilipino-Ingles. Quezon City: Manlapaz Publishing Co.
Pangilinan, Michael Raymon M. 2004. Critical Diacritical. In Kapampangan Magazine, ed. by Elmer G. Cato,32-33, Issue XIV. Angeles City: KMagazine.
Samson, Venancio. 2004. Problems on Pampango Orthography. In Kapampangan Magazine, ed. by Elmer G. Cato,32-33, Issue XII. Angeles City: KMagazine.
Samson, Venancio. 2011. Kapampangan Dictionary. Angeles City: The Juan D. Nepomuceno Center for Kapampangan Studies, Holy Angel University Press. 
Tayag, Katoks (Renato). 1985. "The Vanishing Pampango Nation", Recollections and Digressions. Escolta, Manila: Philnabank Club c/o Philippine National Bank.
Turla, Ernesto C. 1999. Classic Kapampangan Dictionary. Offprint Copy

External links

Sínúpan Singsing, de facto language regulator
Bansa Kapampangan-English Dictionary
Kapampangan Wiktionary
10 ICAL Paper – Issues in Orthography
10 ICAL Paper – Importance of Diacritical Marks
10 ICAL Paper – Transitivity & Pronominal Clitic Order
Austronesian Basic Vocabulary Database
Electronic Kabalen – New Writing on Kapampangan Life & Letters
Dying languages
State can still save Kapampangan
Wikibook Kapampangan
Siuala ding Meangubie
Online E-book of Arte de la Lengua Pampanga by Diego Bergaño. Originally published in 1736.

 
Central Luzon languages
Verb–subject–object languages